In Ancient Egypt, Gebu was a high official with the title high steward and royal sealer during the late Twelfth or early Thirteenth dynasty of the late Middle Kingdom.

Attestation
Gebu is only known from one statue.

At Thebes, a grandorite statue of Gebu sitting with crossed-legs was found in the Temple of Amun at Karnak. Inscriptions show that the statue was a gift from an unnamed king and dedicated to the god Amun. The stylistic features put it to the late Twelfth Dynasty or early Thirteenth Dynasty.

Literature
 Mogens Joergensen: Catalogue Egypt I (3000–1550 B.C.): Ny Carlsberg Glyptotek. Ny Carlsberg Glyptotek, Kopenhagen 1996, ISBN 87-7452-202-7, S. 188–189, Nr. 78.
 Marsha Hill: Statue of the High Steward Gebu in a Cross Legged Pose. In: Adela Oppenheim, Dorothea Arnold, Dieter Arnold, Kei Yamamoto (Hrsg.): Ancient Egypt Transformed, The Middle Kingdom. Yale University Press, New York 2015, ISBN 978-1-58839-564-1, S. 133–134, Nr. 66.

References
Met Museum | https://www.metmuseum.org/art/collection/search/591298

Copenhagen, Ny Carlsberg Glyptotek AEIN 27

Marsha Hill: Statue of the High Steward Gebu in a Cross Legged Pose. New York 2015, S. 133.

Officials of the Thirteenth Dynasty of Egypt
Ancient Egyptian high stewards